Florin Matache (born 3 August 1982) is a Romanian former footballer who played as a goalkeeper.

Honours
Dinamo București
Liga I: 2006–07
Supercupa României runner-up : 2007

Concordia Chiajna
Cupa Ligii runner-up: 2015–16

Flacăra Horezu
Liga III: 2017–18

References

External links
 
 

1982 births
Living people
Footballers from Bucharest
Romanian footballers
Association football goalkeepers
CSO Plopeni players
FC Dinamo București players
CSM Ceahlăul Piatra Neamț players
CS Otopeni players
FC Universitatea Cluj players
CS Sportul Snagov players
SCM Râmnicu Vâlcea players
CS Concordia Chiajna players
LPS HD Clinceni players
AFC Turris-Oltul Turnu Măgurele players
Liga I players
Liga II players
Liga III players